Norheimsund is the administrative centre of the municipality of Kvam in Vestland county, Norway. The village of Steine is a suburb, immediately to the west of Norheimsund.

Norheimsund has a lot of tourist traffic, especially in the summers. The waterfall Steinsdalsfossen, as of 2006 the 6th most visited natural tourist attraction in Norway, is located in Steine, just west of Norheimsund before the entrance to the Toka Gorge.

Norheimsund is the seat of municipal government and largest commercial center in the municipality with about 50 stores. There is also some industry in the village with factories, wood processing plants, and food processing plants. The newspaper Hordaland Folkeblad is published in Norheimsund. Norheimsund Church is located in the village. The Norheimsund Upper Secondary School is also located here. The waterfront area in Norheimsund has been redeveloped and beautified, and has won awards for development (in 2000) and for attractiveness (in 2013).

History
The downtown center of Norheimsund was destroyed by a large fire on 7 October 1932. It was rebuilt with very functionalist-style architecture (rather than historic). During the Nazi occupation of Norway during World War II, the Germans had a large training camp at Norheimsund and large fortifications were built along the bay.

References

External links

 Norheimsund.info

Villages in Vestland
Kvam